The Gudur–Chennai section is a railway line connecting  in the Indian state of Andhra Pradesh and  of Tamil Nadu. The main line is part of the Howrah–Chennai main line and New Delhi–Chennai main line.

Jurisdiction
Gudur is under the administrative jurisdiction of South Coast Railway, and the rest of the line up to Chennai is under the administrative jurisdiction of Southern Railway.

Due to heavy and incessant rains  from 3 to 5 November 1957, water overflowed the track at many places between Tada and Nayudupeta stations on the Madras–Gudur section of the Southern Railway resulting in the interruption of through communication from the  afternoon of 4-11-1957 

 The damage was caused both to the track and bridges on the Akkampet-Sullurpeta-Nayudupeta section of the Madras–Bezwada line on 4-11-1957 due to heavy rain and estimated cost of damage is about 2.5 lakhs.
 About 410 passengers  on  No. 16 Up Grant Trunk Express and about 500 passengers on  No. 18 Up Janta Express which were scheduled to arrive at Madras on 4-11-1957 were held up at Sullurpeta and Dhoravari Chattram stations respectively.

References

External links

5 ft 6 in gauge railways in India
Rail transport in Andhra Pradesh
Rail transport in Tamil Nadu